Roget Rocks is a small group of rocks 4 nautical miles (7 km) southwest of Spring Point in Hughes Bay, Graham Land. Surveyed by K.V. Blaiklock of Falkland Islands Dependencies Survey (FIDS).
It is named after Peter Mark Roget (1779–1869), British physician, natural theologian and lexicographer, best known as author of Thesaurus of English words and phrases (London, 1852), a work frequently consulted in connection with Antarctic place-name proposals.

References

Rock formations of Graham Land
Danco Coast